Damir Beća (born 13 February 1969) is a Bosnian professional football manager and former player. He was most recently the manager of First League of FBiH club Jedinstvo Bihać.

Personal life
Beća's son Omar is also a professional footballer.

Managerial statistics

Honours

Manager
Radnik Hadžići
Second League of FBiH: 2018–19 (Center)

References

External links
Damir Beća at Vecernji.ba

1969 births
Living people
Footballers from Sarajevo
Bosnia and Herzegovina footballers
FK Radnik Hadžići players
Premier League of Bosnia and Herzegovina players
First League of the Federation of Bosnia and Herzegovina players
Bosnia and Herzegovina football managers
FK Goražde managers
FK Radnik Hadžići managers
NK Metalleghe-BSI managers
NK Jedinstvo Bihać managers
Association footballers not categorized by position